Anne C. Steinemann is an American civil and environmental engineering academic who has specialized chiefly in the fields of "healthy built environments, indoor air quality, consumer product emissions and exposures, drought management, and climate-related hazards", with a focus on engineering and sustainability. Currently professor of civil engineering at the University of Melbourne and professor of engineering at James Cook University, she has also advised numerous government and industry bodies in the United States and Australia and appeared widely in press, radio, television and website segments communicating her findings to the general public.

Early life and education
In 1984 she graduated from the University of California, Irvine with a B.S. (magna cum laude) in civil and environmental engineering. In 1985 she graduated from University of California, Los Angeles with a M.S. in civil and environmental engineering. In 1993 she was awarded a Ph.D. by Stanford University in civil and environmental engineering.

Career

Steinemann began her professional career as an assistant/associate professor at the Georgia Institute of Technology (1995-2004), professor of civil and environmental engineering and professor of public affairs at the University of Washington (2004–13), and program manager at the Scripps Institution of Oceanography (2012–15).

She was appointed as acting/visiting professor at Linköping University (1988–89), Florida Institute of Technology (2001-12), and Stanford University (2010–11).

From 2015 she has been professor of civil engineering in the Department of Infrastructure Engineering at the University of Melbourne. From 2018 she has also been professor of engineering and chair of sustainable infrastructure at James Cook University, Australia.

Pollutant exposures, indoor air quality, fragranced consumer products
Since 2007 Steinemann has focused much of her research on "pollutant exposures and associated health effects, including topics of indoor air quality, consumer product testing and evaluation, exposure assessment, and healthy homes and communities".

She has published research papers and monographs on the health effects of fragranced products (such as perfume, household cleaners, laundry supplies, personal care products, scented candles and air fresheners), concluding that those products "impair rather than improve indoor air quality" and "pose a range of health and economic risks".

She has found that emissions of carcinogenic and hazardous air pollutants from "green", "organic" and "all-natural" fragranced products were not significantly different from regular fragranced products.

Furthermore, she has noted that "relatively few ingredients of the fragranced product emissions" are "disclosed to the public", that "more than 156 VOCs were emitted from the 37 fragranced consumer products" examined by her, and that of those "156 VOCs, 42 VOCs were classified as toxic or hazardous under US federal laws, and each product emitted at least one of these chemicals". However, of more than 550 volatile ingredients emitted from these products, fewer than three percent were disclosed on any label or safety data sheet.

Her nationally representative population studies found that 34.7% of adults in the US, 33.0% in Australia, 33.1% in Sweden, and 27.8% of people in the United Kingdom report adverse health effects from exposure to fragranced products. Adverse health effects include asthma attacks, breathing difficulties, migraine headaches, dizziness, seizures, rashes, and gastrointestinal problems.  The effects are also economic with "more than 20% of respondents entering a business, but leaving as quickly as possible if they smell air fresheners or some fragranced product".

Further, 15.1% of Americans report they lost workdays or lost a job, in the previous year, due to illness from fragranced product exposure in the workplace. Personal costs due to these lost workdays and lost jobs were estimated at $132 billion in one year (2016).

Health effects from exposure to fragranced products can be so severe as to be disabling, according to her studies. Across the four countries (US, Australia, Sweden, and the United Kingdom), 9.5% of the general population report adverse health effects that could be considered disabling, according to legislation in each country.

Fragrance-free environments were preferred by a strong majority of the population across four countries, as her studies found.  For instance, more than twice as many people would prefer that workplaces, health care facilities and professionals, hotels, and airplanes were fragrance-free rather than fragranced.

Awards
 2014 - Science Service Award - Department of Water Resources (State of California), for developing "useful science" to "bridge between the academic research community and practitioners".
 2011 - Engineer of the New Millennium - National Science Foundation. 
 1998 - CAREER Award - National Science Foundation.

Bibliography

Books
 Fragranced Consumer Products: Emissions, Exposures, Effects by Anne C. Steinemann, William C. Apgar and H. James Brown. Anne Steinemann, 2020.
 Microeconomics for Public Decisions by Anne C. Steinemann. 3rd edition, Anne Steinemann, 2018 (earlier editions: 1st edition, Mason, Ohio: Thomson/South-Western, 2005; 2nd edition, Menlo Park, California: Askmar Publishing, 2010). Co-authors for 1st edition: William C. Apgar and H. James Brown.
 Exposure Analysis. Edited by Wayne R. Ott, Anne C. Steinemann and Lance A. Wallace. Boca Raton, Florida: Taylor & Francis, 2006; Boca Raton, Florida: CRC Press, 2007.

Articles
For an extensive listing of articles in refereed journals, see: Publications.

Lectures, Documentaries
See: Public Lectures and Interviews

References

External links
 Dr. Anne Steinemann - official website
 Media Coverage - interviews, etc. in international print and electronic media

1961 births
Living people
University of California, Irvine alumni
University of California, Los Angeles alumni
Stanford University alumni
Environmental engineers
American women engineers
American expatriate academics
Academic staff of the University of Melbourne
American civil engineers
American expatriates in Australia
People from San Diego County, California
University of Washington faculty
20th-century American engineers
21st-century American engineers
20th-century women engineers
21st-century women engineers
Engineers from California
21st-century American women writers
20th-century American women
American women academics